The 22931/22932 Bandra Terminus–Jaisalmer Superfast Express is a Superfast train belonging to Western Railway zone that runs between  and  in India. It is currently being operated with 22931/22932 train numbers on a weekly basis.

Service

22931/Bandra Terminus–Jaisalmer Superfast Express has an average speed of 55 km/hr and covers 1230 km in 22h 15m.
22932/Jaisalmer–Bandra Terminus Superfast Express has an average speed of 55 km/hr and covers 1230 km in 22h 10m.

Route and halts 

The important halts of the train are:

Schedule

Coach composition

The train has standard LHB rakes with max speed of 130 kmph. The train consists of 22 coaches:

 2 AC II Tier
 6 AC III Tier
 8 Sleeper coaches
 3 General
 2 End-on Generator
 1 Pantry car

Traction

Both trains are hauled by an Electric Loco Shed, Vadodara-based WAP-7 electric locomotive from Bandra to Ahmedabad. From Ahmedabad, trains are hauled by a Diesel Loco Shed, Vatva-based WDM-3A diesel locomotive uptil Jaisalmer, and vice versa.

Rake sharing

The train shares its rake with 22933/22934 Bandra Terminus–Jaipur Weekly Superfast Express.

Gallery

See also 

 Bandra Terminus railway station
 Jaisalmer railway station
 Jaipur Bandra Terminus Superfast Express

Notes

References

External links 

 22931/Bandra Terminus - Jaisalmer SF Express India Rail Info
 22932/Jaisalmer - Bandra Terminus SF Express India Rail Info

Transport in Mumbai
Transport in Jaisalmer
Express trains in India
Rail transport in Maharashtra
Rail transport in Gujarat
Rail transport in Rajasthan
Railway services introduced in 2014